The Affiliated Eye Hospital of  Wenzhou Medical University is a Chinese institution for study and treatment in the fields of Ophthalmology and Optometry. The hospital was founded in 1998 in Zhejiang Province of the People's Republic of China. The institute collaborates with the New England College of Optometry to offer a Joint MS/OD Degree of optometry and ophthalmology, in which participating students undertake clinical practice both in Wenzhou and Boston. The hospital is associated with national government programs including the Optometry Research Center (Ministry of Public Health), the key laboratory for visual science (Ministry of Health) and the National key lab, Optometry and Ophthalmology, and Vision Science (Ministry of Science and technology).

Periodical 
The Chinese Journal of Optometry & Ophthalmology, published since 1999, is a bimonthly journal, co-sponsored by China National Optometry Research Center and Wenzhou Medical College. It is the only academic journal of optometry in China.

References

External links 
 Official Affiliated Eye Hospital Website  
 Official Affiliated Eye Hospital Website  

Hospital buildings completed in 1998
Hospitals in Zhejiang
Hospitals established in 1998
1998 establishments in China
Buildings and structures in Wenzhou
Eye hospitals
Wenzhou Medical University